The Saints Philip and James Parochial School in St. James, Nebraska, 1.5 miles ESE of Wynot, Nebraska, United States, also known as St. James Marketplace, is a one-story stuccoed building built in 1919.  It was listed on the National Register of Historic Places in 2003.

It was designed and built by local contractor Henry Stuckenhoff.  It is a rare Mission Revival style building for northeast Nebraska.

References

School buildings on the National Register of Historic Places in Nebraska
Mission Revival architecture in Nebraska
Buildings and structures completed in 1919
Buildings and structures in Cedar County, Nebraska
Schools in Nebraska